Friedrich Ferdinand Schnitzer was a prominent architect and builder who was the principal architect for many structures listed on the National Register of Historic Places, including the Ohio State Reformatory in Mansfield, Ohio. Schnitzer developed original sketches designing the building to resemble the Bavarian castles he remembered from his youth in Kempten, Bavaria.

He lived in Delaware, Ohio and then Mansfield, Ohio. His business became Schnitzer & Son when he was joined by one of his sons. His father and one of his sons were also named Friedrich Schnitzer.

The Richland County Infirmary replaced the prior building that burned in 1878.

He bid on culvert construction projects in Plymouth Township.

Work
Richland County Infirmary, 3220 Mansfield-Olivesburg Road in Mansfield, Ohio
Delaware City Hall in Delaware, Ohio (1873)
Richland County Infirmary, also known as Richland County Home (NRHP listed) Now known as Dayspring

Soldiers and Sailors Memorial (Mansfield, Ohio) (1888) at 34 Park Avenue West in Mansfield. NRHP listed. Now a museum. 
Soldiers' and Sailors' Monument (Cleveland), supervising architect.
Ohio State Reformatory (built 1886 - 1910), also known as the Mansfield Reformatory. Schnitzer was supervising architect, and his name was found in documents contained in the cornerstone confirming him as architect. Schnitzer was presented with a silver double inkwell from the governor of the state in a lavish ceremony to thank him for his services.

References

Architects from Ohio